Anisha Anil Patel (born 17 August 1995) is an English cricketer who currently plays for Warwickshire and Central Sparks. She plays as a right-arm leg break bowler.

Domestic career
Patel made her county debut in 2012, for Warwickshire against Lancashire, in which she took 1/10 from 5 overs. In the 2013 Women's Twenty20 Cup, she took 5 wickets at an average of just 5.20, and a season later she was Warwickshire's joint-leading wicket-taker in the same tournament, with 6 wickets at an average of 14.00. In 2015, she took 8 wickets at an average of 18.62 in the County Championship.

In 2017 and 2018, Patel was Warwickshire's leading wicket-taker in the County Championship, with 14 and 10 wickets, respectively. In 2017 she was also the joint-third leading wicket-taker across the whole tournament, and achieved her List A best bowling figures, taking 6/17 against Nottinghamshire. In 2019, Patel helped her side to the Twenty20 Cup title, taking 8 wickets at an average of 14.50, including best bowling figures of 4/12. In the 2021 Women's Twenty20 Cup, she took 3 wickets at an average of 20.33. In the 2022 Women's Twenty20 Cup, she was the leading wicket-taker across the entire competition, with 15 wickets at an average of 10.00. She took two four-wicket hauls in the competition, against Somerset and Gloucestershire.

In 2020, Patel played for Central Sparks in the Rachael Heyhoe Flint Trophy. She appeared in five matches, taking 8 wickets at an average of 25.25, the joint-most for the side. Her best bowling of 3/49 came in the Sparks' narrow defeat against Lightning. In 2021, she played one match for the side in the Rachael Heyhoe Flint Trophy, taking one wicket, and two matches in the Charlotte Edwards Cup, again taking 1 wicket. She played one match for the side in 2022, against Northern Diamonds in the Rachael Heyhoe Flint Trophy.

References

External links

1995 births
Living people
Cricketers from Birmingham, West Midlands
Warwickshire women cricketers
Central Sparks cricketers